Richard Rowe (9 March 1828 – 9 December 1879) was an English author, also active in Australia.

Biography

Rowe was born at Spring Gardens, Doncaster, then in the West Riding of Yorkshire, England, the son of Thomas Rowe, a Wesleyan minister. Thomas Rowe died while Richard was still very young; the remaining family moved to Colchester, where Richard was educated at Mr Bradnack's school.

Rowe came to Australia in 1853; by 1857 he was working on the Month and The Sydney Morning Herald sometimes using the pseudonym 'A Sassenach Settler'. In 1858 his Peter 'Possum's Portfolio was published in Sydney by Jacob Richard Clarke, a volume of prose and verse dedicated to his benefactor Nicol Drysdale Stenhouse. The prose included a short novel, Arthur Owen--An Autobiography, and most of the verse consisted of translations.

He belonged to a circle of writers which included Frank Fowler, William Wilkes and Sheridan Moore.

Rowe returned to England, wrote for the newspapers and magazines, and was also the author of several books for young people, some of which did not appear until after his death on 9 December 1879 in Middlesex Hospital. Amongst his better works were Episodes in an Obscure Life (1871) and Friends and Acquaintances (1871).

Rowe married in 1860 Mary Ann Yates, daughter of Jonathan Patten, who survived him with a son and three daughters.

Rowe was in Australia for relatively short period, but two of his lyrics have been included in more than one anthology of Australian verse, including An Anthology of Australian Verse (1907), and Peter 'Possum's Portfolio is one of the earliest books of serious literature published in Australia. E. Morris Miller lists 18 of Rowe's books in his Australian Literature from its Beginnings, at least three of which have an Australian setting.

He was buried on the eastern side of Highgate Cemetery.

Publication 
 The Boy in the Bush: A Tale of Australian Life
 Roughing It
 The Deserted Ship
 A Haven of Rest

References

1828 births
1879 deaths
Burials at Highgate Cemetery
English writers